Major-General Francis Henry Kelly  (26 July 1859 – 18 March 1937) was Commander of British Troops in South China.

Military career
Kelly was commissioned into the Royal Engineers as a lieutenant on 6 April 1879. He took part in the Burma expedition in 1885, was promoted to captain on 1 April 1889, and then went to the North West Frontier in India in 1897 where he participated in the Tirah Campaign, during which he was promoted to major on 1 October 1897. Following the campaign he received a brevet promotion to lieutenant-colonel on 20 May 1898.

He was appointed temporary assistant adjutant-general in Quetta District on 23 June 1900 (while the actual A.A.G. served in the Boxer Rebellion in China), serving as such for several years. He was further appointed Commander of the Karachi Brigade in 1905 and Commander of the Ahmednagar Brigade in 1907. After that he became Commander of British Troops in South China in 1913 and General Officer Commanding 69th (2nd East Anglian) Division in November 1915 during the First World War before retiring in 1918.

After the War he became a Regional Director at the Ministry of Pensions.

References

|-

1859 births
1937 deaths
Burials in Kent
British Army major generals
Military personnel from Bristol
British Army generals of World War I
Royal Engineers officers
Companions of the Order of the Bath
Companions of the Order of St Michael and St George
British military personnel of the Tirah campaign
British military personnel of the Third Anglo-Burmese War